Acacia leptophleba is a shrub belonging to the genus Acacia and the subgenus Juliflorae that is endemic to northern Australia.

Description
It has smooth or slightly rough, grey coloured bark. The slightly angular branchlets are light to dark brown in colour. It blooms in May or September to October and produces golden yellow flowers.

Taxonomy
The species was first formally described by the botanist George Bentham in Ferdinand von Muellers 1859 work Contributiones ad Acaciarum Australiae Cognitionem published in the Journal of the Proceedings of the Linnean Society, then again by Bentham in 1864 as part of the work Flora Australiensis. It was reclassified by Leslie Pedley as Racosperma leptophlebum in 2003 but was transferred back to the genus Acacia in 2006.

Distribution
It is native to an area in the Northern Territory and the Kimberley region of Western Australia where it is found on river flats an among gorges growing in sandy and loamy soils over quartzite and sandstone and are often part of Eucalyptus and Heteropogon woodland communities or on savannah grassland communities along with spinifex.

See also
 List of Acacia species

References

leptophleba
Acacias of Western Australia
Flora of the Northern Territory
Plants described in 1864
Taxa named by Ferdinand von Mueller